Elective Abortion in Argentina is legal in the first 14 weeks of gestation. The abortion law was liberalized after the Voluntary Interruption of Pregnancy Bill (Argentina) was passed by the National Congress in December 2020. According to the law, any woman can request the procedure at any public or private health facility. Doctors are legally bound to either perform it or, if they are conscientious objectors, refer the patient to another physician or health facility. Only four other Latin or South American countries have legalised abortion on request: Cuba in 1965, Guyana in 1995, Uruguay in 2012 and Colombia in 2022. According to polling in 2021, around 44% of Argentinians support the legalization of abortion on request; other polls showed 50–60% of Argentinians opposed the bill.

The voluntary termination of pregnancy (IVE, by its Spanish acronym) has been demanded by the feminist movement since the 1970s. In 2005, the National Campaign for Legal, Safe, and Free Abortion, an organisation that leads the cause for abortion legalisation in Argentina, was founded. Since 2007, the Campaign has annually submitted an abortion legalisation bill to the National Congress, but it was added to the legislative agenda for the first time in 2018, when then President Mauricio Macri sponsored the debate. The bill was passed by the Chamber of Deputies, but rejected by the Senate. In 2020, newly elected President Alberto Fernandez fulfilled his campaign promise and sent a new, government-sponsored bill (slightly different to the one written by the Campaign) for legalising abortion on request up to the 14th week of pregnancy. It was passed again by the Chamber of Deputies, and this time, by the Senate, in December 2020.

Prior to 2020, a 1921 law regulated access to and penalties for abortions. Any woman that intentionally caused her own abortion or consented to another person performing one on her, was faced with one to four years of prison. In addition, any participant in the procedure could face up to fifteen years of prison, depending on the consent given by the woman, her eventual death, and the intent of the participant. The same penalty applied to doctors, surgeons, midwives, and pharmacists that induced or cooperated in the induction of an abortion, with the addition of a special license withdrawal for two times the length of their sentence. However, abortion could be performed legally by a certified doctor if:

 It had been made to avoid a threat to the life or health of the woman, and this danger could not be avoided by other means;
 The pregnancy was a result of rape, or an indecent assault against a feeble-minded or demented woman.

The last and only official report on the number of abortions was published in 2005, and according to this report, there are around 370,000 to 520,000 both legal and illegal abortions per year in Argentina. Many failed abortion attempts and deaths due to them are not recorded as such and/or are not notified to the authorities. Enforcement of anti-abortion legislation is variable and complex; there are multiple NGOs providing women with help to access drugs that can interrupt pregnancies, as well as doctors who openly perform the procedure. The anti-abortion movement, along with the Catholic Church, has lobbied against the legalization of abortion, and has threatened to take the new abortion law to court.

Legal and political debate
The Constitution of Argentina does not establish specific provisions for abortion, but the 1994 reform added constitutional status for a number of international pacts, such as the Pact of San José, which declares the right to life "in general, from the moment of conception". The interpretation of the expression "in general" in certain cases of abortion is still subject to debate.

In 1998, after a visit to the Vatican and an interview with Pope John Paul II, President Carlos Menem passed a decree declaring 25 March the Day of the Unborn Child. The date was due to the Catholic Holy Day of the Annunciation (that is, the conception, by the Blessed Virgin Mary, of Jesus Christ, the Son of God, in her womb). The Menem administration had already aligned with the Holy See in its complete rejection of abortion and contraception. During the first celebration of the new holiday, in 1999, the President stated that "the defense of life" was "a priority of [Argentina's] foreign policy".

President Fernando de la Rúa (1999–2001) was not outspoken about its Catholic belief and its influence in government policies, but effectively kept them unchanged.

President Néstor Kirchner (elected in 2003) professed the Catholic faith, but was considered more progressive than his predecessors. In 2005, Health Minister Ginés González García publicly stated his support for the legalization of abortion. Kirchner did neither support nor criticize González García's opinion in public. In a private interview, later, he assured that the law regarding abortion would not be changed during his term. In any case, harsh criticism from the Catholic Church soon shifted the focus to a "war of words" between the religious hierarchy and the national government.

Carmen Argibay, the first woman ever to be appointed to the Supreme Court of Argentina by a democratic government, also caused great controversy as she admitted her support for abortion rights. Anti-abortion organizations, led by the Catholic Church, expressed their opposition to the appointment for this cause.

In May 2006, the government made public a project to reform the Penal Code, which includes the de-criminalization of abortion. A commission studied the issue and produced a draft, intended to be presented to Congress. The project was signed by the Secretary of Criminal Policy and Penitentiary Affairs, Alejandro Slokar. On 28 May 2007, a group of 250 NGOs forming the National Campaign for Legal, Safe, and Free Abortion presented a draft legislative bill to the Argentine Chamber of Deputies that would provide unrestricted access to elective abortion up to the 12th week of pregnancy, and allow women to abort after that time in cases of rape, grave fetal malformations, and mental or physical risk to the woman.

In March 2012 the Supreme Court ruled that abortion in case of rape or threat to women's life is legal and that an affidavit of being raped is enough to allow a legal abortion. It also ruled that provincial governments should write protocols for the request and treatment of legal abortions in case of rape or life threat.

2018 bill

In early 2018, after years of lobbying by different groups, then President Mauricio Macri encouraged the discussion of an abortion law during the 2018 opening of regular sessions of the National Congress of Argentina. He stated that, despite identifying as anti-abortion on this issue, he would not ban a decision by Congress on the matter. Therefore, Congress began debating a bill written by the National Campaign for Legal, Safe, and Free Abortion, that would effectively legalize abortion on request in Argentina and make it available in all hospitals and clinics. The bill was debated alongside other measures to address gender inequality, such as extension of parental leave. On 14 June 2018, the Chamber of Deputies passed the bill with 129 votes for, 125 against and 1 abstention. The proposal divided both the legislators of Cambiemos and the Justicialist Party. However, on 9 August 2018 the bill was rejected by the Senate with 31 votes for, 38 against and 2 abstentions.

2020 bill 
Alberto Fernández, elected President of Argentina in 2019, made legal abortion a central point of his campaign. Days after his inauguration, the Ministry of Health issued a protocol that stated how hospitals and clinics should handle abortion in case of rape. Due to the COVID-19 pandemic, the introduction of the bill was postponed until November 2020. In that month, the Argentinian government sent a bill to the National Congress that would legalise elective abortion up to the 14th week of pregnancy, along with a second bill which aimed to protect women that chose to continue with their pregnancy. After the 14th week, abortion would be legal in cases of rape or if the woman's life or health is in danger. This bill was first passed by the Chamber of Deputies, 131 to 117 (with 6 abstentions), after a 20-hour debate, on 11 December 2020, and later by the Senate, 38 to 29 (with 1 abstention), on 30 December 2020. The bill's passing resulted in large-scale celebrations by pro-abortion rights activists who had long campaigned for the right to abortion. Alberto Fernández signed the bill into law on 14 January 2021, and it entered into force on 24 January 2021.

Abortion protocols

It is often the case that women who may have sought an abortion under the legal provisions of the Penal Code are not appropriately (or at all) informed of this possibility by the attending physicians, or are subject to long delays when they request a legal abortion. Physicians, due to lack of knowledge of the law and fearing legal punishment, often demand that the patient or her family request judicial authorization before terminating a pregnancy, which sometimes can extend the wait beyond the time when it is advisable to abort.

In March 2007, Buenos Aires Province health authorities released a protocol addressing the provision of legal abortion procedures without delays or need for judicial authorization. The main change regarding previous treatments of abortion was the explicit recognition that any case of rape can be a threat to the psychic health of the victim and thus justify an abortion request.

An abortion protocol drafted by the National Institute Against Discrimination, Xenophobia and Racism (INADI) was presented, starting in May 2007, to provincial health ministers and legislatures for consideration. This protocol includes a series of procedures to be conducted in order to assess an abortion and the maximum permissible time spans for them. It also features a proposal to create a national registry of conscientious objectors.

In June 2007, the legislative body of Rosario, Santa Fe Province, adopted a protocol similar to that of Buenos Aires. Physicians assisting a woman covered by Article 86 of the Penal Code are obligated to explain her condition to the patient, offering the choice of terminating the pregnancy, as well as counseling before and after the abortion. The protocol explicitly forbids the judicialization of the procedure and warns that physicians who delay a legal abortion are liable to administrative sanctions and civil or penal prosecution.

In November 2007, the legislature of La Pampa Province passed an abortion protocol law which included provisions for conscientious objectors and dictated that public hospitals would have to comply with an abortion request in any case. This would have made La Pampa the first district in Argentina to have an abortion protocol with the status of provincial law.
The law, however, was vetoed by governor Oscar Mario Jorge as one of his first acts of government, less than three weeks later, with the argument that its new interpretation of previous legislation could be deemed unconstitutional. The protocol was attacked with the same argument by the bishop of Santa Rosa, Rinaldo Fidel Bredice, on the day it was first passed.

On 12 December 2019, the Argentina Ministry of Health issued a protocol expanding hospital abortion access to pregnancies which resulted from rape. In addition, the protocol provided that girls as young as 13 years of age can have abortions in such cases without the consent of either of their parents. The protocol also weakened a doctor's ability to refuse to perform such abortions due to personal objection as well.

Social debate
Argentina has a robust network of women's organizations whose demands include public access to abortion and contraception, such as the Women's Informative Network of Argentina (RIMA) and Catholic Women for the Right to Choose (Católicas por el Derecho a Decidir). , held annually in different cities, gathers these and other feminist and pro-abortion groups. The 34th Women's Meeting, held in October 2019 in La Plata, included a 200,000-people demonstration for, among other women's rights, legalization of abortion.

The opposition to abortion is centered on two fronts: the religious one, led by the Catholic Church, and voiced by the ecclesiastical hierarchy and a number of civil organizations, which consider abortion a murder; and the legal one, represented by those who claim that abortion is forbidden by the Constitution (which must override the Penal Code).

A December 2003 Graciela Romer y Asociados survey found that 30% of Argentines thought that abortion should be allowed "regardless of situation", 47% that it should be allowed "under some circumstances", and 23% that it should not be allowed "regardless of situation".

A survey conducted in early 2005, commissioned by the Argentine branch of the Friedrich-Ebert Foundation, showed that 76% respondents were in favour of legalizing abortion for cases of rape (that is, regardless of the mental capacity of the woman), and that many (69%) also wanted abortion legalized when the fetus suffers from a deformity that will make it impossible for it to survive outside the womb.

A 2007 survey by Mónica Petracci, Doctor in Social Sciences, showed that 37% of Argentines agree with abortion when the woman wishes; another 56% disapprove of the measure.

In a survey conducted in September 2011, nonprofit organization Catholics for Choice found that 45% of Argentineans were in favor of abortion for any reason in the first twelve weeks. This same poll conducted in September 2011 also suggested that most Argentineans favoured abortion being legal when a woman's health or life is at risk (81%), when the pregnancy is a result of rape (80%) or the fetus has severe abnormalities (68%).

A March 2020 survey by the Universidad de San Andrés, found that 43% favor abortion "regardless of situation". In case of rape, an average of 82% agreed with abortion (with a 95% of non-believers agreed, while in the most religious segment fell to 69%).

It is a common belief in Argentina that, the higher the economic status of the pregnant woman, the easier it is for her to get a safe abortion, while poorer women often cannot afford a clandestine procedure under sanitary conditions or post-abortion care.

21st-century cases
Several cases of pregnancy resulting from rape and one involving a nonviable fetus have sparked debate about abortion in Argentina since the beginning of the 21st century. In 2001, 25-year-old Luciana Monzón, from Rosario, Santa Fe, discovered that the fetus in her womb, at 16 weeks of gestation, was anencephalic. There was virtually no chance of survival for the baby once it left the womb. Four weeks later she asked for judicial authorization to terminate the pregnancy. First one judge and then another excused themselves from dealing with the request, and the case went to the Supreme Court of Santa Fe, which dictated that the first judge should decide. By that time, however, Monzón had decided to take it to term, because of the delay. The baby was born spontaneously, weighing only 558 grams, and died 45 minutes after birth.

In 2003, a 19-year-old rape victim from Jujuy Province, Romina Tejerina, had a baby in secret and killed her, according to tests, in a psychotic episode. In 2005 she was sentenced to 14 years in prison. She had not accused the rapist, and had managed to conceal her state. Townspeople, public figures and some politicians expressed her support for Tejerina as a victim, and many pointed out that she should have had the chance to resort to abortion. Most notably, the sentence prompted Health Minister Ginés González García to state his support for legal abortion for rape victims.

2006
In 2006, two cases of rape of mentally disabled women became subject of extensive media coverage and debate. One of them involved 19-year-old L.M.R., from Guernica, Buenos Aires Province. Her mother noticed the pregnancy, guessed what had taken place, and went to the public San Martín Hospital in La Plata to request the abortion, allowed under the provisions of the Penal Code. The Ethics Committee of the hospital studied the case, as usual, but the prosecutor of the rape case alerted judge Inés Siro about the upcoming abortion, and Siro blocked it, based on "personal convictions". The block was appealed, and the Supreme Court of Buenos Aires overruled Siro, but the physicians at the hospital excused themselves saying that the pregnancy was now too advanced. The family of the victim was approached by a non-governmental organization that collected money and paid for the mentally disabled woman to have the abortion performed in a private context, by an undisclosed physician.

The other case, which came into the public light at about the same time, was that of a 25-year-old rape victim in Mendoza Province with an acute mental and physical disability. The mother of the victim requested and was granted judicial authorization, but as the pre-surgical tests were being performed at the Luis Lagomaggiore Hospital, the abortion was blocked by a judicial request (a kind of injunction) interposed by a Catholic organization. On appeal, the injunction was rejected by the Supreme Court of Mendoza, and the abortion was performed as originally planned.

As a result of both cases, all but two of the provincial Health Ministers issued a joint statement supporting the medical teams and health authorities responsible for the abortions, and expressing their commitment to the law. Minister González García further stated that "there are fanatics that intimidate and threaten" and that "tolerance to fanatical groups must be ended".

References

External links
 Red Informativa de Mujeres de Argentina (Women's Informative Network of Argentina, RIMA).

Argentina
Argentina
Society of Argentina
Healthcare in Argentina
Law of Argentina
Women's rights in Argentina